Hassan Nayebagha is a retired Iranian football player.

Club career 
He played for Homa F.C. In 1975, he reached the third place in the Iranian league, 1976 he reached the second place with Homa in the Iranian league along with national team colleagues like Nasser Nouraei, Sahameddin Mirfakhraei, Alireza Khorshidi and Alireza Azizi.

International career 
Nayebagha was a member of the Iranian team winning the Asia Cup 1976 in Tehran and reaching the quarterfinals of the Olympic Tournament in Montreal in 1976.

He also played for the Iran national football team and played in two of the matches at the 1978 FIFA World Cup, played the full 90mins against Netherlands and came on as a substitute in the game against Scotland.

After career 
Nayebagha joined after the Iranian Revolution together with Bahram Mavaddat the People's Mujahedin of Iran, today he is one of the leaders if this anti-IRI movement.

References 

 Planet World Cup
 RSSSF

1950 births
1976 AFC Asian Cup players
1978 FIFA World Cup players
AFC Asian Cup-winning players
Iran international footballers
Iranian footballers
Living people
Homa F.C. players
Olympic footballers of Iran
Footballers at the 1976 Summer Olympics
Association football midfielders
People's Mojahedin Organization of Iran members